Medstead is a village and civil parish in the East Hampshire district of Hampshire, England. According to the 2011 census, the village had a population of 2,036 people.

The earliest evidence of settlement in the village comes from two Tumuli burial grounds which date from 1000 BC. Roman pottery and coins have also been found in the area. A chapel in the village was first mentioned in the Domesday Survey of 1086 and was soon replaced by a Norman church. The village has six Grade II listed buildings, including the 12th century St Andrew's Church and its war memorial, a farmhouse and a Victorian wheelhouse with a working donkey wheel. Medstead was one of the first villages in the United Kingdom to receive broadband.

The parish contains three individual hamlets; South Town, Soldridge and Hattingley. Medstead also has its own restored railway station on the Watercress Line, services from which connect with the nearest national rail station  at Alton railway station.

History

Ancient to Roman
Medstead has a history dating back up to 3,000 years. The earliest evidence of settlement in the area comes from two Tumuli burial grounds which are believed to date from 1000 BC, as well as a ringfort which dates from approximately 500 BC. Roman pottery and coins have also been found in the village. The name has been spelt in many different ways in the Middle Ages, including: Maedstede, Maydstede, and Midsted. A theory for the name is that "Mid-Stead" signified a "half way place", as in feudal times the village was on a road from Farnham to Winchester. Following the baptism of Cynegils of Wessex in 635, an area of land was granted to the church at Winchester. The area became known as the "Liberty of Alresford" and contained parts of present-day Old Alresford, New Alresford and Medstead. The first mention of the village itself came from the Domesday Survey of 1086, in which the survey listed a chapel. In 1160, St Andrew's Church was built on the existing site of the chapel and some parts of the original chapel were enlarged.

14th century to Georgian

Medstead Manor can be traced from the 14th century. In 1316, the Bishop of Winchester held the manor of Medstead and all adjacent land until 1346 when ownership was transferred. Seven years later, Martin de Hertham and his wife, Isabel, passed control of lands, rents and taxes in Medstead to William de Overton. He was followed by his son, also named William, who held lands in Medstead as well as a settlement called "Tadelyng" in 1428.

By the 18th century, Edward Rookes held Medstead Manor, although it is uncertain if he purchased or inherited it. In 1749, Rookes sold the manor to Sir William Jolliffe for £1400, after which the manor of Medstead disappeared from records.

In 1852, The British Gazetteer described Medstead as:

Enclosure
Medstead suffered two private parliamentary enclosure acts: 1735 titled Stankham and Soldridge Commons; and 1798, a joint bill, but separate allotment, with the adjoining village at Bentworth.

The first Medstead parliamentary award was made in March, 1736, and was a rapid piece of work. The wording and arrangements showed that careful attention had been paid to its contested parent in Ropley in 1709. It was planned to cover an estimated 500 acres although the exercise eventually scooped just over 650 acres, an increase of about a third. The primary protagonists were the lord of the manor of Old Alresford, Benjamin Hoadly, also bishop of Winchester and patron of the rectory of Old Alresford, which included Medstead; and John Shackleforth, lord of its subsidiary or ‘inferior’ manor of Medstead. This pair were closely supported by the Warden and Fellows of Winchester College, the President and Fellows of Magdalen College in Oxford and Joseph Soley, Rector of Old Alresford. Of course, the wardenship and the rectory were both in the gift of the bishop.

The second Medstead award of just over 231 acres was made in 1799.There is a sense of unfinished business from the first Medstead, or Soldridge, act of 1735. The aftermath of this second foray gutted Medstead of its commercial life and blighted the village. The charge was led by the gentleman trustees of a deceased Henry Drummond, esquire and lord of the manor, his nephew Charles Drummond and George Wheatley. This was the first local enclosure without a prominent part for a bishop of Winchester, now Brownlow North, but his son stood in his place: Francis, the rector of Old Alresford, worth £560 a year, whose remit included the chapelries of New Alresford, £250, and Medstead, £600.

Victorian to present day
Medstead's railway station was first opened in August 1868. The 1881 census for the Alton Union Workhouse included three paupers born in Medstead (then named 'Medsted'), including an 86 year old widow labourer, a 63 year old 'disability lunatic' who served as a domestic servant and a 26 year old 'disability idiot'. Medstead's parish boundary was altered in 1973 after the ecclesiastical parish of Four Marks was created. An underground bunker for the Royal Observer Corps was built in the village in 1963 and was continuously used until its closure in 1968.

Medstead received broadband internet in 2003, becoming one of the first villages in the United Kingdom to be connected. In 2018, Medstead's upgrade to Superfast broadband was completed as part of a county-wide initiative.

Transport

Medstead's railway station was first opened in August 1868 and was renamed to Medstead and Four Marks railway station on 1 October 1937. Having closed in 1973, the station was restored and re-opened in May 1983, following the reopening of the associated Watercress Line from New Alresford to Ropley having re-opened six years earlier in 1977; the decision was taken by Mid Hants Railway to restore the entire railway so that it could run its course to the town of Alton. Around  of second hand track panels were purchased from Eastleigh for the Medstead and Four Marks section. The surviving buildings at the railway station were dilapidated, with one writer from a magazine suggesting they be demolished and replaced by a bus shelter. As the track was relaid at the station, a replacement wooden signal box was obtained from Wilton and placed into position near the track.

Geography
The landscape is dominated by farms and woodland such as Medstead Grange, Imber Farm and Bushy Leaze Wood. The parish contains three individual hamlets: South Town, Soldridge and Hattingley. One of the Hampshire's high points at 716 feet (218 m), King's Hill, runs through Medstead and Bentworth.

Climate
Due to its location in south central England and its proximity to the sea, the average maximum temperature in January is 7.2 °C (45 °F) with the average minimum being 1.6 °C (35 °F). The average maximum temperature in July is 21.9 °C (71 °F), with the average minimum being 12.5 °C (55 °F). The village gets around 755 millimetres (29.7 in) of rain a year, with a minimum of 1 mm (0.04 in) of rain reported on 103 days a year.

Demographics
According to the 2011 census, the parish of Medstead had a population of 2,036 people, of which 36.10% were in full-time employment and 13.30% in part-time employment, both slightly below the national average. There are 859 dwellings in the parish with an average size of 2.52 people.

The 2011 census reported an almost equal number of males (1016, 49.9%) as females (1020, 50.1%), of which the majority (1988, 97.6%) were white ethnicity, broadly similar to the ethnical diversity of the wider Hampshire region, where 111,635 (96.56%) are registered on the 2011 census as being white ethnicity.

Education and activities
Medstead Church of England Primary School lies immediately south of the village near the cemetery. Under the Education Act 1944, the previous site of Medstead's school was declared inadequate as it did not have enough space to accommodate a playing field and assembly hall. The school was consequently relocated to a larger site south of the village, where it is today. A pre-school has been in operation since September 1989, located in the grounds of the primary school after a successful petition ensured its relocation from the village hall.

The village hall is used for various activities, including hosting the village's gardening and lawn tennis clubs. In addition, Medstead has its own cricket club which has been in operation for over 150 years and a Bowls Club occupying a  playing field which houses eight rinks. The main village hall was first built in the 1970s and has a capacity of 200 people; 150 people can be accommodated seated around tables or 120 for formal occasions. A separate small hall can accommodate 50 people with en suite kitchen and a separate bar area.

Governance
The village falls under the East Hampshire parliament constituency, represented in the House of Commons by Conservative MP Damian Hinds since 2010. In County Council elections, Hampshire is divided into 75 electoral divisions that return a total of 78 councillors; Medstead, along with Bentworth, is in Alton Rural Electoral Division. In district council elections, East Hampshire is divided into 38 electoral wards that return a total of 44 councillors; Medstead is in Downland Electoral Ward, together with Four Marks.

Landmarks

A chapel in the village was first mentioned in the Domesday Survey in 1086. The Norman church of St Andrew was first constructed in 1160 after the previous chapel was demolished. The church has flint walls whereas its chancel has cemented walls, along with windows dating from the 14th century. The church was restored in the 19th century, along with a nave extension and the addition of a new chancel arch. The churchyard has a Grade II listed war memorial which is dedicated to fallen soldiers of the First World War. The memorial is made out of Cornish granite and features a Celtic cross with a crusader's sword sculpted in its centre; it was unveiled on 17 October 1920 by Admiral Jervoise and dedicated by the rector of St Andrew's Church.

Medstead contains a total of six Grade II listed buildings. Southdown Old Farmhouse is a small manor which dates from the 18th century and has undergone 20th century restorations and extensions; the manor was designated as a listed building on 31 May 1985. Another Grade II listed building is a Victorian wheelhouse with a donkey wheel which lies immediately southwest of Southdown Old Farmhouse. The wheelhouse was built in the early 19th century and consists of weatherboarded timber frames on brick plinths. The donkey wheel is in working order and is made of a large timber axle with a rope hanging over a well.

Further reading
Heal, Chris, Ropley's Legacy, The ridge enclosures, 1709 to 1850: Chawton, Farringdon, Medstead, Newton Valence and Ropley and the birth of Four Marks,  (Chattaway and Spottiswood, 2021)[7]

Heal, Chris, The Four Marks Murders,  (Chattaway and Spottiswood, 2020, 2nd edition 2021).

Moody, Nellie, A Short History of Medstead (The Women's Institute, Medstead 1932)

Montgomery, Roy, The village of Medstead and parish of St Andrew (Hampshire Genealogical Society, No 01)

Munby, Julian, edited, Domesday Book, 4, Hampshire (1086; Phillimore, Chichester 1982)

Rathbone, Lorents, A Chronicle of Medstead (1966)

References

External links

 Medstead Parish Council website
 Medstead Village website – medstead.org
 Stained Glass Windows at St. Andrew, Medstead, Hampshire

Villages in Hampshire
Civil parishes in Hampshire
East Hampshire District